The Yudh Seva Medal is one of India's military decorations for distinguished service during wartime. It is awarded for a high degree of distinguished service in an operational context, which includes times of war, conflict, or hostilities and may be  awarded posthumously.

The award is the wartime equivalent of the Vishisht Seva Medal, which is a peacetime distinguished service decoration.

In 2019, Minty Agarwal became the first woman given the Yudh Seva Medal.

Eligibility
The Yudh Seva Medal may be awarded posthumously. It is awarded for distinguished service of an exceptional order during war/conflict/hostilities. It may be awarded to all ranks of the Army, the Navy and the Air Force including those of Territorial Army Units, Auxiliary and Reserve Forces and other lawfully constituted Armed forces when embodied, as well as nursing Officers and other members of the Nursing Services in the Armed Forces.

Design
The medal is circular in shape, 35mm in diameter and fitted to a plain horizontal bar with standard fittings. The medal is of gold gilt. The medal has on its obverse the State Emblem and the inscriptions in Hindi and English embossed along the upper rim. On its reverse, it has a five pointed star. The riband is in Gold colour with three red vertical stripes dividing it into four equal parts. 

If a recipient of the medal is subsequently awarded the medal again, every such further award shall be recognized by a Bar to be attached to the riband by which the medal is suspended. For every such Bar, a miniature insignia of a pattern approved by the Government shall be added to the riband when worn alone. The medal may be awarded posthumously.

See also
 Vishisht Seva Medal - the peace-time equivalent

References

External links 
Indian Air Force's page on Yudh Seva Medal

Military awards and decorations of India
Awards established in 1980